"Facts Concerning the Late Arthur Jermyn and His Family" (also known as "The White Ape" and simply "Arthur Jermyn") is a short story in the horror fiction genre, written by American author H. P. Lovecraft in 1920. The themes of the story are tainted ancestry, knowledge that it would be best to remain unaware of, and a reality which human understanding finds intolerable.

Plot

The story begins by describing the ancestors of Sir Arthur Jermyn, a British nobleman. His great-great-great-grandfather was Sir Wade Jermyn, an early explorer of the Congo region whose books on a mysterious white civilization there were ridiculed. He was confined to an asylum in 1765. Lovecraft describes how the Jermyn family has a peculiar physical appearance that began to appear in the children of Wade Jermyn and his mysterious and reclusive wife, who Wade claimed was Portuguese.

Wade's son, Philip Jermyn, was a sailor who joined the navy after fathering his son and disappeared from his ship one night as it lay off the Congo coast. Philip's son, Robert Jermyn, was a scientist who made two expeditions into the interior of Africa. He married a daughter of the (fictional) 7th Viscount Brightholme and fathered three children, two of whom suffered from severe disabilities, but the middle one of whom, Nevil Jermyn, had a son, Alfred, who was Arthur's father. In 1852, Robert met with an explorer, Samuel Seaton, who described "a grey city of white apes ruled by a white god". Robert killed the explorer after hearing this, as well as all three of his children. Nevil managed to save his son, Alfred, before his death. Robert was put in an asylum and, after two years, died there.

Alfred grew up to inherit his grandfather's title but abandoned his wife and child to join a circus, where he became fascinated with a gorilla "of lighter colour than the average". He became its trainer, but was killed in Chicago after an incident in which the gorilla attacked him and he fought back. Arthur inherited the family possessions and moved into Jermyn House with his mother.

Arthur is described as having a very unusual appearance, and supposedly the strangest in the line descended from Wade. Arthur became a scholar, eventually visiting the Belgian Congo on a research expedition, where he heard tales of a stone city of white apes and the stuffed body of a white ape goddess, which had since gone missing. Returning to a trading post, Arthur talks to a Belgian agent who offers to both obtain and ship the goddess's body to him. Arthur accepts his offer and returns to England. After a period of several months, the body arrives at Jermyn House. Arthur begins his examination of the mummy, only to run away from his room screaming, and later commit suicide by dousing himself in oil and burning himself alive.

Lovecraft then describes the contents of the stuffed goddess's coffin—the ape goddess has a golden locket around her neck with the Jermyn arms on it and bears a striking resemblance to Arthur Jermyn. It is clear that Wade's supposedly Portuguese wife was really the ape goddess, and all of his descendants were the product of their bestial union. Arthur's remains are neither collected nor buried on account of this. The mummy is removed and burnt by the Royal Anthropological Institute.

Inspiration
Both of Lovecraft's parents died in a mental hospital, and some writers have seen a concern with having inherited a propensity for physical and mental degeneration reflected in the plot of  his stories, especially his 1931 novella, The Shadow over Innsmouth, which shares some themes with Facts Concerning the Late Arthur Jermyn and His Family. As in many of his stories, the mind of a character deteriorates as his investigations uncover an intolerable reality, a central tenet of Cosmicism which Lovecraft outlines in the opening sentence of "The Call of Cthulhu": "The most merciful thing in the world, I think, is the inability of the human mind to correlate all its contents." In a letter, Lovecraft described the impetus behind Facts Concerning the Late Arthur Jermyn and His Family:

Publishing history and possible influences
The story was first published in the journal The Wolverine in March and June of 1921. To Lovecraft's distaste, the story was retitled "The White Ape" when it appeared in Weird Tales in 1924; he commented: "If I  ever entitled a story 'The White Ape', there would be no ape in it." Subsequent reprintings titled it "Arthur Jermyn" until the corrected publishing in Dagon and Other Macabre Tales in 1986.

Critic William Fulwiler suggests that the plot of "Arthur Jermyn" may have been inspired by Edgar Rice Burroughs's novels The Return of Tarzan (1913) and Tarzan and the Jewels of Opar (1916), in which the lost city of Opar is "peopled by a hybrid race resulting from the matings of men with apes." E. F. Bleiler, too, has commented that  it "undoubtedly owes much to Edgar Rice Burroughs's Opar in his Tarzan series".

See also
 Humanzee

References

Sources
  Explanatory Notes by S. T. Joshi.
 Frye, Mitch, "The Refinement of "Crude Allegory" : Eugenic Themes and Genotypic Horror in the Weird Fiction of H.P. Lovecraft", Journal of the Fantastic in the Arts, vol. 17, issue 3, Fall 2006, pp. 237–254 (JSTOR 26390171).
 Simmons, David, "“A Certain Resemblance”: Abject Hybridity in H. P. Lovecraft's Short Fiction", in New critical essays on H. P. Lovecraft, New York: Palgrave Macmillan, 2013, pp. 31–54.

External links
 
 
 
 Winesburg, Ohio, Sherwood Anderson; complete text at Bartleby.com
 The Return of Tarzan, Edgar Rice Burroughs; complete text at Project Gutenberg
 Tarzan and the Jewels of Opar, Edgar Rice Burroughs; complete text at Project Gutenberg

1921 short stories
Fiction about suicide
Apes in popular culture
Horror short stories
Short stories by H. P. Lovecraft
Works originally published in American magazines